On August 19, 2020, Cincinnati Reds play-by-play announcer Thom Brennaman was suspended in the middle of a broadcast for making a homophobic statement over the air. During Brennaman's on-air apology, Reds outfielder Nick Castellanos hit a home run, which led Brennaman to interrupt the apology to deliver a home run call before continuing on. The surreal nature of the apology gave it notoriety in baseball internet culture and has led to its use as a copypasta.

Background
Before the start of the top of the seventh inning of the first game of a doubleheader between the Cincinnati Reds and the Kansas City Royals at Kauffman Stadium in Kansas City, Missouri, Reds announcer Thom Brennaman was caught on a hot mic describing an unnamed location as "one of the fag capitals of the world". According to David J. Halberstam, who interviewed Brennaman more than a year after the incident, the aforementioned city was San Francisco.

Brennaman, who was broadcasting from Great American Ball Park in Cincinnati due to COVID-19 travel precautions, continued into a promotion for the Reds pregame show and went on to provide play-by-play for the Reds on Fox Sports Ohio into the second game of the double header. Backlash quickly grew as clips of the incident were shared across social media.

Apology

During the top of the fifth inning of the second game, Brennaman was pulled off the air by Fox Sports Ohio. Before being replaced by Jim Day, Brennaman issued an apology:

During the apology, Nick Castellanos hit a home run which landed next to a Planet Fitness billboard with the phrase "Judgment Free Zone". Brennaman interrupted his apology to provide play-by-play for the home run before abruptly returning to his apology.

Reactions
The Cincinnati Reds issued a statement on Twitter expressing apologies and announcing Brennaman's immediate suspension.
Reds pitchers Amir Garrett and Matt Bowman tweeted separate statements in support of the LGBTQ community. The following day, Fox Sports announced that Brennaman would no longer serve as an announcer for the channel's National Football League broadcasts.

Some media commentators noted that the apology appeared weak and insincere. Human Rights Campaign president Alphonso David described the incident as "unfortunate", stating "I think we need to really think about how this is how he felt so comfortable in the first place." GLAAD released a statement calling Brennaman's apology "incredibly weak and not enough".

On September 25, 2020, after Brennaman announced his resignation, Reds CEO Bob Castellini issued a statement calling the announcer a "fantastic talent and a good man who remains part of the Reds family forever".

Castellanos acknowledged the incident in a February 2023 Instagram post ahead of Spring Training. The post, a video that shows Castellanos practicing his swing, has the caption "And there's a deep drive... Phillies '23".

Impact
In a podcast that aired in November 2021, Brennaman revealed his disappointment in the response to his apology stating:

After the incident, Brennaman began working with LGBTQ outreach groups such as the Children's Home of Northern Kentucky and PFLAG. Local LGBTQ leaders in Cincinnati have cited Brennaman's subsequent work in the LGBTQ community as reasons to support his return to broadcasting.

Copypasta

Jokes incorporating Brennaman's statement began shortly thereafter, including one tweet by Pablo S. Torre combining it with Richard Nixon's resignation speech. The use of the apology as a copypasta did not gain traction until after Castellini's September 25 statement praising Brennaman. Ryan M. Milner attributes the proliferation of the copypasta to the virality of the original apology and to the non sequitur-like nature of the home run call. According to Milner, the copypasta allows people to joke about being cynical in avoidance of being fooled.

References

Internet memes introduced in 2020